Singapore competed at the 1956 Summer Olympics in Melbourne, Australia.

Athletes
The following Singaporean athletes participated in the games:

Athletics
Janet Jesudason
Mary Klass
Kesavan Soon
Tan Eng Yoon

Basketball
Sy Kee Chao
Lee Liat Beng
Chen Sho Fa
Henderson Jerome
Ho Lien Siew
Ko Tai Chuen
Lee Chak Men
Ong Kiat Guan
Wee Tian Siak
Wong Kim Poh
Yee Tit Kwan
Yeo Gek Huat

Hockey
Abdullah Hamid
Ajit Singh Gill
Arumugam Vijiaratnam
Burdette Mathew Coutts
Chai Hon Yam
Devadas Vellupillai
E. N Pillai
Edwin Jeyaceilan Doraisamy
Fred Fernandez
Michael George Wright
Osbert John de Rozario
Percy Milton Pennefather
Roy Sharma
Roland Schoon
Rudolf William Mosbergen
S. Jeyathurai
Sinnadurai Vellupillai
William Douglas Hay

Water polo
Kee Soon Bee
Tan Eng Liang
Chee Lionel
Gan Eng Teck
Lim Ting Kiang David
Lim Teck Pan
Oh Chwee Hock
Tan Eng Bock
Thio Gim Hock
Alexander Wolters
Wiebe Wolters
Yeo Oon Tat Eric

Weightlifting
Tan Howe Liang
Tan Ser Cher (7th place)
Wong Kay Poh

Yachting
Kenneth Golding
Robert Ho
Ned Holiday
Keith Johnson
Jack Snowden

References

Official Olympic Reports

Nations at the 1956 Summer Olympics
1956
Oly